Rotenberg may refer to:

Places
 Places in Baden-Württemberg, Germany:
 Rotenberg (Rauenberg)
 Rotenberg (Stuttgart)
 Hills in Germany
 Rotenberg (ridge), a hill range between Eichsfeld and Harz in Lower Saxony
 Rotenberg (Kaiserslautern), a hill near Kaiserslautern-Erfenbach
 Original name of Württemberg, a hill in Schurwald in Baden-Württemberg
 Rotenberg (555 m), an outlier of the Rammert in the district of Tübingen in Baden-Württemberg
 Judge Rotenberg Educational Center, a special needs school in Canton, Massachusetts

People with the surname
 Arkady Rotenberg (born 1951), Russian businessman and tycoon
 Boris Romanovitch Rotenberg (born 1957), Russian business man and oligarch
 Cristine Rotenberg (born 1988), Canadian YouTube personality and former child actress
 Roman Rotenberg (born 1981), Russian businesspeople
 Boris Borisovich Rotenberg (born 1986), professional footballer
 Eric Rotenberg, American engineer
 Marc Rotenberg (born 1960), American lawyer

See also
 Samara Routerberg (died 2017), American murder victim
 Rothenberg (disambiguation)
 Rotenburg (disambiguation)
 Rothenburg (disambiguation)
 Rottenburg (disambiguation)
 Rottenberg
 Rodenberg